Lévêque is a village in the Cabaret commune in the Arcahaie Arrondissement, in the Ouest department of Haiti.

See also
Cabaret, for a list of other settlements in the commune.

References

Populated places in Ouest (department)